Mark Andrew Wood (born 11 January 1990) is an English cricketer who plays internationally for England in all formats. In domestic cricket, he represents Durham, and has played for Chennai Super Kings in the Indian Premier League.

Wood made his Test, One Day International (ODI) and Twenty20 International (T20I) debuts in 2015. He was part of the England teams that won the 2019 Cricket World Cup and 2022 T20 World Cup.

Wood plays as a right-handed fast bowler, and is currently one of the fastest bowlers in the world, with an average Test pace of 89 mph since 2020.

Domestic career

Minor counties
Wood made his debut in county cricket for Northumberland in 2008 against Norfolk in the MCCA Knockout Trophy.  He played Minor counties cricket for Northumberland from 2008 to 2010, making 3 Minor Counties Championship appearances and 3 MCCA Knockout Trophy appearances.

Durham
In the 2011 season, he made his debut for Durham in a first-class match against Durham MCCU.  He followed this up by making his List A debut against Northamptonshire in the 2011 Clydesdale Bank 40.  He has since made a further first-class appearance against Sri Lanka A, and a further List A appearance against Scotland in the Clydesdale Bank 40. Wood made his debut for the England Lions in their 2014 tour of Sri Lanka.

Franchise cricket
On 28 January 2018, Wood was bought by Chennai Super Kings for INR 1.5 crores (~£160,000) for the 2018 IPL season. In February 2022, he was bought by the Lucknow Super Giants in the auction for the 2022 Indian Premier League tournament. However, he was ruled out of the tournament due to an elbow injury.

In April 2022, he was bought by the London Spirit for the 2022 season of The Hundred.

International career

2015: West Indies and Ireland
In March 2015, Wood was named in the England Test squad for the tour of the West Indies. However, he did not play in the series.

He made his One-Day International debut for England against Ireland on 8 May 2015. The match was affected by rain and little cricket was played, although Wood did take his first international wicket.

2015: New Zealand

He made his Test debut for England later the same month against New Zealand. In the first Test Wood took figures of 3–93 in New Zealand's first innings. He then took 1–47 in their second innings to help England win the match by 124 runs and go 1–0 up in the series. In the following Test Wood continued to impress, taking figures of 2–62 in New Zealand's first innings. He also made a useful 19 with the bat. In New Zealand's second innings he took another three wickets, this time at the expense of 97 runs. England lost the match by 199 runs and the series was drawn at 1–1.

Wood played in the third ODI against New Zealand, taking figures of 1–48. In the next game he took figure of 1–49 to help England win by seven wickets and level the series at 2–2. Although Wood did not take a wicket in the final game of the series, taking 0–70, England still won to win the series 3–1.

He made his Twenty20 International debut in the same series on 23 June 2015. He finished with figures of 3–26 as England won by 56 runs.

2015: Ashes series

Wood took 2–68 in Australia's first innings of the first Ashes Test and followed this up by taking 2–53 in their second innings to help England win the match by 169 runs. In the second Test he only took one wicket in the Australian first innings, finishing with figures of 1–92 as England lost the match by 405 runs. He was ruled out of the third Test through injury, but returned in the fourth Test, taking 1–13 in Australia's first innings. In the second innings he took figures of 3–69 including the wicket that won the match for England, which meant they regained the Ashes. England lost the final Test of the series, with Wood taking 1–59 in Australia first innings. However, England won the series 3–2 to regain the Ashes.

Wood was selected for the first ODI against Australia, although he was expensive, finishing with figures of 1–72 as Australia won the game. He kept his place for the next game, but he again proved expensive, this time finishing with 0–65 from his nine overs, although England went on to win the game by three wickets. After being dropped from the side for the next two games, he returned for the final ODI and took figures of 1–25, although a poor batting performance from England meant they lost the game and the series 3–2.

2015: Pakistan
He played in the first Test against Pakistan although he only picked up one wicket in the match, which ended in a draw, as England were unable to force a win due to bad light. He played in the second Test, which England lost, although he performed well. He took 3–39 in Pakistan's first innings and followed this up with another two wickets in the second innings, although Pakistan went on to win the match in convincing fashion, by 178 runs.

An ankle injury ruled Wood out of England's entire series against Sri Lanka, and he also missed the start of the return series against Pakistan.

2016: Pakistan
Wood returned from injury in time for the first ODI against Pakistan. He took figures of 1–57 as England won by 44 runs on the D/L Method. He took 3/46 in the next match as England restricted Pakistan to 251 and won the match by four wickets. In the third match of the series he took figures of 1–75 as England won by 169 runs. After missing the fourth match, he returned for the final match of the series and took figures of 2–56, although England lost the match by four wickets, although they won the series 4–1.

2019: West Indies
Wood was called up to replace injured Olly Stone in a 3-test tour of the West Indies.  He did not play in the first 2 matches, both of which England lost, but was drafted in to the team for the third test in St.Lucia.  Wood bowled the fastest of any bowler in the match and in the Windies' first innings took 5 wickets for 41 runs off 8.2 overs – his first five-wicket Test haul helping England to a 142-run lead over West Indies on day two of the final test.

2019 Cricket World Cup
In April 2019, he was named in England's squad for the 2019 Cricket World Cup. On 14 June 2019, in the match against the West Indies, Wood took his 50th wicket in ODIs. On 11 July 2019, in the semi-final against Australia, Wood played in his 50th ODI match for England. In the Cricket World Cup Final, Wood, batting at number 11, was run out off the last ball of the match which led to the game going to a Super Over. Wood also sustained a side injury during the game, which ruled him out of the first three Tests of the 2019 Ashes series.

2020 – 2022
After missing the 2019 Ashes series and tour of New Zealand, Wood returned to Test cricket in the third test of the 2019–20 tour of South Africa following injuries to James Anderson and Jofra Archer. After scoring 42 runs from 23 balls in England's first innings, he took 3/32 in South Africa's second innings as England won. In the fourth test, Wood took nine wickets, including 5/46 in South Africa's first innings, and scored 35 with the bat as England won again.

On 29 May 2020, Wood was named in a 55-man group of players to begin training ahead of international fixtures starting in England following the COVID-19 pandemic. On 17 June 2020, Wood was included in England's 30-man squad to start training behind closed doors for the Test series against the West Indies. On 4 July 2020, Wood was named in England's thirteen-man squad for the first Test match of the series.

In September 2021, Wood was named in England's squad for the 2021 ICC Men's T20 World Cup.

Wood was selected for the 2021–22 Ashes.
In September 2022, Wood was named in England's squad for the 2022 ICC Men's T20 world cup in Australia. Wood was the fastest bowler of the tournament and played in every Super 12 game for England before succumbing to injury and missing out on the semi final and final. England went on to win the tournament, making Wood one of only 6 players to win both the 2019 ODI and 2022 T20 world cups.

Personal life
Wood is married, with a son.  He is teetotal, and a supporter of the Labour Party. He supports Newcastle United F.C.

References

External links

 

1990 births
Living people
Sportspeople from Ashington
Cricketers from Northumberland
English cricketers
England Test cricketers
England One Day International cricketers
England Twenty20 International cricketers
Northumberland cricketers
Durham cricketers
North v South cricketers
Cricketers at the 2019 Cricket World Cup